Dennis Schmitz (August 11, 1937 – September 12, 2019) was an American poet.

Life
Dennis Schmitz grew up in Dubuque, Iowa.  He graduated from Loras College and the University of Chicago, where he met and married Loretta D'Agostino in 1960; they have five children together.  He has taught at Illinois Institute of Technology, University of Wisconsin–Milwaukee and California State University, Sacramento.
His former students include Raymond Carver, Charlene Ungstad, Gary Short, and Gary Thompson.

He opposes the death penalty and protests executions in California every time they take place.

His work has appeared in the Alaska Quarterly Review, American Poetry Review, The Nation, Paris Review, the Chicago Review, and Zyzzyva.

He resided in Sacramento.

Awards
 2000–2002 Poet Laureate of Sacramento, California
 1987–1988 Shelley Memorial Award
 1978 Guggenheim Fellow
 1976–1977, 1985–1986, 1992–1993 Fellow, National Endowment for the Arts

Works

Poetry
 Animism (Oberlin College Press, 2014)
 The Truth Squad (Copper Canyon Press, 2002)
 About Night: Selected and New Poems (Oberlin College Press, 1993)
 Eden (University of Illinois Press, 1989)
 Singing (Ecco Press, 1985)
 String (Ecco Press, 1980)
 Goodwill, Inc (1976)
 Double Exposures (1971)
 We Weep for Our Strangeness (1969)

Editor

References

External links
 Bull, Catherine. "Dennis Schmitz's 'The California Phrasebook'".
 Eskimo Pie Girl (Rebecca Morrison). "Dennis Schmitz Poets".
 Sacramento Poetry Center. "Dennis Schmitz".

Poets from California
Poets from Iowa
American male poets
Loras College alumni
University of Chicago alumni
Illinois Institute of Technology faculty
University of Wisconsin–Milwaukee faculty
California State University, Sacramento faculty
Writers from Dubuque, Iowa
1937 births
2019 deaths